Boa Nova National Park is a national park in the state of Bahia, Brazil.

Location

The Boa Nova National Park covers parts of the municipalities of Boa Nova, Dário Meira and Manoel Vitorino in Bahia.
The park drains into the Uruba River, a tributary of the Gongogi River, which in turn is a tributary of the de Contas River.

The park is in the Atlantic Forest biome.
Vegetation includes caatinga, semi-deciduous submontane forest, montane rainforest and semi-deciduous lowland forest.
The region is well known for the many species of birds, with 437 recorded to date, which attract many foreign birdwatchers.
Endemic bird species include the endangered or threatened slender antbird (Rhopornis ardesiacus), Bahia spinetail (Synallaxis whitneyi) and Bahia tyrannulet (Phylloscartes beckeri).

Administration

The Boa Nova National Park was created by decree on 11 June 2010.
It is administered by the Chico Mendes Institute for Biodiversity Conservation.
The adjoining Boa Nova Wildlife Refuge was created in the same decree.
The park became part of the Central Atlantic Forest Ecological Corridor, created in 2002.
It is classed as classed as IUCN protected area category II.
The purpose is to fully protect and regenerate the natural ecosystems in the transition between Atlantic Forest and Caatinga, to maintain viable populations of species of birds and endangered mammals, especially the slender antbird, to maintain and restore watersheds and waterways, to enable development of educational activities and environmental interpretation, recreation in contact with nature, ecological tourism and scientific research.

Notes

Sources

2010 establishments in Brazil
National parks of Brazil
Protected areas of Bahia
Protected areas of the Atlantic Forest